Reginald Walter Davies (10 October 1933 – September 2019) was an English football goalkeeper who played 296 league games in a 13-year career in the Football League with West Bromwich Albion, Walsall, Millwall Leyton Orient, and Port Vale. He won the Fourth Division title with Millwall in 1961–62.

Career
Davies began his career at West Bromwich Albion, just as Vic Buckingham's "Baggies" finished second in the First Division in 1953–54, four points behind champions Wolverhampton Wanderers. They then finished a disappointing 17th in 1954–55. Davies played only four league games at The Hawthorns, and moved on to Walsall, who were struggling near the foot of the Third Division South. John Love's "Saddlers" finished 20th in 1955–56 and 15th in 1956–57, with Davies playing 53 league games at Fellows Park. He then moved on to league rivals Millwall in May 1958, who had finished in 23rd place in 1957–58 to become founder members of the Fourth Division. Jimmy Seed's "Lions" posted a ninth-place finish in 1958–59, before finishing just four points outside the promotion places in 1959–60 under the stewardship of Reg Smith. They ended the 1960–61 campaign in sixth place, though were this time ten points short of the promotion zone. Promotion was finally won in style, as manager Ron Gray – the man who originally signed Davies to the club – returned to lead Millwall to the title in 1961–62, one point ahead of Colchester United. They ended the 1962–63 campaign in 16th place in the Third Division. Davies played 211 league and cup games during his six years at The Den and was nicknamed "The Cat" by supporters. He moved on to Benny Fenton's Leyton Orient in July 1963, and played 11 Second Division games in the 1963–64 season. He signed with Freddie Steele's Port Vale in July 1964. After winning his first team place from Ken Hancock, he was the "Valiants" number 1 between November 1964 and February 1965, before he himself was replaced by new manager Jackie Mudie's signing Jimmy O'Neill. He played 14 league and FA Cup games in the season, as Vale were relegated out of the Third Division. He left Vale Park and returned to Brisbane Road in March 1965 for a small fee. He played 16 league games as Dave Sexton's Orient were relegated out of the Second Division at the end of the 1965–66 season, and Davies then retired from the Football League.

Style of play
Davies was a muscular and agile goalkeeper.

Later life
He later worked at Jersey Airport and completed his national service with Royal Artillery. He died in September 2019, aged 85.

Career statistics
Source:

Honours
West Bromwich Albion
Football League First Division second-place promotion: 1953–54

Millwall
Football League Fourth Division: 1961–62

References

1933 births
2019 deaths
Sportspeople from Tipton
English footballers
Association football goalkeepers
West Bromwich Albion F.C. players
Walsall F.C. players
Millwall F.C. players
Leyton Orient F.C. players
Port Vale F.C. players
English Football League players
Royal Artillery soldiers
Military personnel from Staffordshire